The article contains information about the 2014–15 Iran 3rd Division football season. This is the 4th rated football league in Iran after the Persian Gulf Cup, Azadegan League, and 2nd Division. The league started from September 2014.

In total and in the first round, 53 teams will compete in 5 different groups.

First round

Group A

Group B

Group C

Group D

Group E

Second round

Group A

Group B

References 

League 3 (Iran) seasons
4